Adam Kenneth Compton Wood (born 13 March 1955) is a retired British diplomat, and was the Lieutenant Governor of the Isle of Man from 2011 to 2016.

Life and career
Wood was educated at the Royal Grammar School, High Wycombe and graduated from Oriel College, Oxford in 1977.

Wood's later career consisted of major diplomatic roles in Africa, as the British High Commissioner to Uganda from 2002 to 2005, then High Commissioner to Kenya from 2005 to 2008. Prior to his retirement from the diplomatic service in 2010, he was Africa Director at the Foreign and Commonwealth Office, managing Britain's embassies in Africa.

He was announced as Lieutenant Governor of the Isle of Man in November 2010, and was sworn in on 7 April 2011.

References

|-

|-

1955 births
Alumni of Oriel College, Oxford
High Commissioners of the United Kingdom to Kenya
High Commissioners of the United Kingdom to Uganda
Lieutenant Governors of the Isle of Man
Living people
People educated at the Royal Grammar School, High Wycombe